Wasco is a former unincorporated community that became part of the village of Campton Hills, Illinois, when it was formed in 2007. It has a post office (ZIP Code 60183), a few restaurants, and an elementary school. The area outside the downtown section is mostly residential homes, spanning several blocks.

History
Wasco was originally named "Campton", after an early family that settled the area. The Wasco post office was originally built in 1836 by a lay preacher named Dr. King on King's Mill Road near Lake Campton. The post office was then moved to its present location on Illinois Route 64 in 1890. Throughout the years, the building has undergone multiple renovations and has served many different functions, including a milk depot, a general store, an antique store, and a repair shop. Other historic buildings in Wasco include the Campton Town Hall built in 1873, the Wasco Baptist Church built in 1891, and Wasco Elementary built in 1906.

References

Unincorporated communities in Illinois
Populated places in Kane County, Illinois
1836 establishments in Illinois